Events from the year 2023 in Northern Ireland.

Incumbents 
 First Minister of Northern Ireland: Vacant
 deputy First Minister of Northern Ireland: Vacant
 Secretary of State for Northern Ireland: Chris Heaton-Harris

Events

January 
 4 January  – The Irish Passport Office suspends posting Irish Passports to Northern Ireland and Great Britain due to the ongoing Royal Mail Strike.
 17 January –
 A 32-year-old man appears before Newry Magistrates’ Court on drug charges after being extradited from the USA by the PSNI’s International Policing Unit.
 The Met Office issued weather warnings as heavy snowfall affects areas around Derry and Strabane.
 18 January – The Met Office issues a 24-hour yellow weather warning across Northern Ireland, with heavy snowfall expected.
 30 January – The Fire Brigades Union in Northern Ireland threatens the government with a strike if they are not given acceptable pay offer.

February 
 2 February – Former British Army soldier David Holden is given a suspended sentence in relation to the death of Aidan McAnespie in 1988.
 16 February – Prime Minister Rishi Sunak arrives in Northern Ireland with plans to meet with local politicians and business representivies to discuss the Northern Ireland Protocol.
 17 February – Sunak holds "positive conversations" with Northern Ireland's political leaders over a Protocol deal, but says there is still "work to do" before an agreement is reached.
 21 February – Thousands of striking teachers and health care workers gather at Belfast City Hall.
 22 February – DCI John Caldwell, an off duty Police Service of Northern Ireland officer, is injured in Omagh after being shot by suspected New IRA gunman.
 23 February – Three men are arrested in relation to the previous evening's shooting of DCI John Caldwell.
 24 February –
 Two further arrests are made as police continue to investigate the Omagh shooting.
 A joint press conference is held by the leaders of Northern Ireland's five main political parties, and PSNI Chief Constable Simon Byrne in regards to the attempted murder of DCI John Caldwell.
 26 February – Police arrest a sixth man in connection with the Omagh shooting.
 27 February – Prime Minister Rishi Sunak and President of the European Commission Ursula von der Leyen announce a new Brexit deal for Northern Ireland, named the Windsor Framework.
 28 February – Sunak meets with businesses and their employees in Belfast, to secure support for his new Brexit deal. He tells them that being in both the single market and the UK makes Northern Ireland the "world's most exciting economic zone" and "an incredibly attractive place to invest."

March 
1 March – A further two arrests are made as police continue to investigate the Omagh shooting.
9 March – Heavy snowfall affects Northern Ireland causing major disruptions.
 13 March – The United States President Joe Biden announced that he will visit Ireland, north and south, in April for the 25th anniversary of the Good Friday Agreement (signed on 10 April 1998).

Scheduled 
 2023 Northern Ireland local elections

Sports 
 2022–23 NIFL Premiership
 2022–23 Irish Cup

Deaths 
 1 February – Eddie Spence, 97, Gaelic footballer (Antrim).
 19 February – Henry McDonald, 57, writer and journalist.
 3 March – Rita O'Hare, 80, Irish Republican and Sinn Féin strategist

References 

Northern Ireland